Linda Louise M. Bennett (born December 25, 1952 in Cincinnati) was named president of the University of Southern Indiana (USI) by its Board of Trustees effective 2009 July 1, incumbent president H. Ray Hoops retiring on 2009 June 30.

Bennett previously served at Wittenberg University, Northern Kentucky University, and Appalachian State University and as USI's provost and vice president for academic affairs. A professor of political science, Bennett has a publication record which includes joint-authorship, with her husband Stephen Earl Bennett, of Living with Leviathan: Americans Coming to Terms with Big Government (2007). According to Michael Margolis, 
No other book has ordered and analyzed a comparable set of data regarding attitudes toward the power of the federal government.
 
Linda Bennett received her baccalaureate and master's degrees and her Ph.D. in political science all from the University of Cincinnati.  The Bennetts reside in Evansville, Indiana.

On August 15, 2017, Bennett announced she would retire as president USI on June 30, 2018.

Notes

Living people
University of Cincinnati alumni
American women political scientists
American political scientists
Northern Kentucky University faculty
Appalachian State University faculty
University of Southern Indiana people
People from Evansville, Indiana
Heads of universities and colleges in the United States
1952 births
American women academics
21st-century American women
Women heads of universities and colleges